, is an imprint of the Japanese record label Victor Entertainment. The Colourful Records imprint was created on June 1, 2011 to specialize in the production and promotion of pop music acts.

Artists
 Ammoflight
 Batten Showjo Tai
 Cocco
 Edda
 Going Under Ground
 Leo Ieiri
 Ayaka Ide
 Iri
 Kiroro
 Kaela Kimura (under the "ELA Music" sublabel)
 Kotone
 Mitsuhiro Oikawa
 Pile
 Rekishi
 Scandal (under the "her" sublabel)
 Ko Shibasaki
 Mariko Takahashi
 Xmas Eileen
 Aoi Yamazaki
 Yogee New Waves
 Rinne Yoshida

References

External links
 

Victor Entertainment
Japanese record labels
Record labels established in 2011
Mass media companies based in Tokyo